Līga Dekmeijere (born 21 May 1983) is a Latvian tennis player.

She has won one doubles title on the WTA Tour, as well as 19 doubles titles on the ITF Women's Circuit. On 26 August 2002, she reached her best singles ranking of world No. 287. On 5 April 2010, she peaked at No. 54 in the doubles rankings.

Dekmeijere has won her only WTA tournament title at the 2008 Cachantún Cup, where she entered the doubles draw with Poland's Alicja Rosolska, defeating Mariya Koryttseva and Julia Schruff in the final.

Playing for the Latvia Fed Cup team, Dekmeijere has a win–loss record of 14–16.

Doubles performance timeline

WTA career finals

Doubles: 7 (1 title, 6 runner-ups)

ITF finals

Singles: 1 (1 runner–up)

Doubles: 30 (20 titles, 10 runner–ups)

Notes

References

External links

 
 
 
 Official website
 ESPN Profile

1983 births
Living people
Sportspeople from Riga
Latvian female tennis players